Legionella saoudiensis is a Gram-negative bacterium from the genus Legionella which has been isolated from sewage water from Jeddah in Saudi Arabia.

References

External links
Type strain of Legionella saoudiensis at BacDive -  the Bacterial Diversity Metadatabase

Legionellales
Bacteria described in 2016